The 1970 Ole Miss Rebels football team represented the University of Mississippi during the 1970 NCAA University Division football season and in the 1971 Gator Bowl against Auburn where Ole Miss lost 35–28. Archie Manning was the quarterback for Ole Miss. This also marked the last season of coach Johnny Vaught's first tenure as the Ole Miss coach.

Season
In the Egg Bowl, Mississippi State beat Ole Miss by a score of 19–14. Ole Miss still held the lead in the series with 35 wins, 26 losses and 6 ties.  In the Magnolia Bowl, LSU beat Ole Miss by a score of 61–17. LSU held the lead in the series with 30 wins, 26 losses, and 3 ties.

Roster

Season summary

Houston

Homecoming

Archie Manning broke his left forearm less than five minutes into the third quarter after being sandwiched between two defenders with Ole Miss leading 14–7.

Gator Bowl
Jim Poole 9 Rec, 111 Yds, TD

Players Selected in 1971 NFL Draft

Awards and honors
 Archie Manning, All-SEC Team
 Archie Manning, third in Heisman Trophy voting

References

Ole Miss
Ole Miss Rebels football seasons
Ole Miss Rebels football